Awj Subdistrict  is a Syrian nahiyah (subdistrict) located in Masyaf District in Hama.  According to the Syria Central Bureau of Statistics (CBS), Awj Subdistrict had a population of 33344 in the 2004 census.

References 

Awj
Masyaf District